Roubal (feminine: Roubalová) is a Czech surname. Notable people with the surname include:

 Ivan Roubal (1951–2015), Czech serial killer
 Jan Roubal (1880–1971), Czech entomologist

See also
Raubal

Czech-language surnames